eTransportation  is a peer-reviewed open-access scientific journal covering all modes of transportation by using electricity (vehicles, ships and airplanes). The journal was established in 2019 and is published by Elsevier. The editor-in-chief is Minggao Ouyang (Tsinghua University). It is emphasized that efforts to advocate UN's goals of sustainable development are welcomed, specifically "Affordable and clean energy".

Abstracting and indexing
The journal is abstracted and indexed in Ei Compendex, Scopus, and the Science Citation Index Expanded. According to the Journal Citation Reports, the journal has a 2021 impact factor of 1.65.

References

External links

Engineering journals
Publications established in 2019
English-language journals
Elsevier academic journals
Creative Commons Attribution-licensed journals
Continuous journals